C01-A042 is a Novichok agent.

See also
Novichok agent
C01-A035
C01-A039

References

External links

Novichok agents
Acetylcholinesterase inhibitors
Organofluorides
Oxime esters
Phosphorofluoridates
Nitro compounds
Ethyl esters